Kim Michele Leadbeater  (born 1 May 1976) is a British Labour Party politician who has served as Member of Parliament (MP) for Batley and Spen since 2021.

Early life and education
Leadbeater was born in 1976 in Dewsbury, West Yorkshire, England, to parents Jean and Gordon. She is the younger sister of former MP Jo Cox (1974–2016). Kim attended Heckmondwike Grammar School, and says that she has lived in "every little bit of" the local area. Leadbeater went on to graduate with a Bachelor of Science (BSc) degree in health-related exercise and fitness from Leeds Beckett University in 2005 and a Postgraduate Certificate in Education (PGCE) from the University of Huddersfield in 2008.

Career
Before moving into politics, Leadbeater was a lecturer in physical health at Bradford College, and has worked as a personal trainer.

Political career
On 23 May 2021, Leadbeater was selected as the Labour Party candidate for the Batley and Spen by-election. Her older sister, Jo Cox, had served as the constituency's MP from May 2015 until her murder in June 2016; Leadbeater contributed to the 2017 book Jo Cox: More in Common. Upon her selection, Leadbeater declared that she was "the candidate the Tories fear." Her selection proved controversial, as Leadbeater had been selected despite only joining the party in recent weeks; the rule requiring that candidates should be a member of the party for a year before being nominated was waived. She had previously been a member of the Labour Party but let this lapse following the murder of her sister.  She was elected as a Member of Parliament (MP) for Batley and Spen on 1 July 2021, with a 323-vote majority. Leadbeater made her maiden speech on 9 September 2021 during a debate on her sister's legacy.

In her first six months in parliament, her two longest speeches were tributes to her sister and to David Amess, another MP who had been murdered. She argued that MPs' safety was not being taken seriously enough, and she called for anonymity on social media to become an exception to combat a culture of abuse.

Political views 
During her campaign she visited a mosque and spoke in favour of a two-state solution to the Israeli–Palestinian conflict. She is a member of Labour Friends of Israel.

Personal life
Leadbeater lives in Gomersal, Kirklees, with her partner Claire. Outside of politics, her main interests are hockey and sport.

In 2020, she was appointed President of West Yorkshire Scouts.

Awards
In 2018, Leadbeater was awarded the UK's one thousandth Points of Light award by Prime Minister Theresa May for having "rejected the hate that marked [her] sister's murder to continue Jo's work and ensure that Jo's determination to change the world has lived on."

In the 2021 New Year Honours, Leadbeater was appointed Member of the Order of the British Empire (MBE) "[f]or services to Social Cohesion, to the community in Batley, West Yorkshire and to Combatting Loneliness during Covid-19", when she was described in The London Gazette as "Ambassador, Jo Cox Foundation and Chair, More in Common Batley and Spen".

References

External links

1976 births
21st-century English women politicians
21st-century English politicians
Alumni of Leeds Beckett University
Alumni of the University of Huddersfield
Female members of the Parliament of the United Kingdom for English constituencies
Jo Cox
LGBT members of the Parliament of the United Kingdom
English LGBT politicians
Labour Friends of Israel
Labour Party (UK) MPs for English constituencies
Living people
Members of the Order of the British Empire
People educated at Heckmondwike Grammar School
People from Batley
People from Heckmondwike
Politicians from Yorkshire
UK MPs 2019–present